Turridrupa prestoni is a species of sea snail, a marine gastropod mollusk in the family Turridae, the turrids.

Description
The length of the shell attains 27.5 mm, its diameter 10.4 mm.

(Original description) The turreted shell is yellowish brown. It contains 11 whorls, the upper bearing two spiral ridges between which is a row of coarse tubercles, the intervening spaces sculptured with minute spiral and transverse striae. The body whorl bears five spiral lirse in addition to the row of tubercles between the first two of these. The base of the shell is coarsely spirally lirate. The aperture is oval. The sinus is broad and rather deep. The columella lip is expanded, erect and forms an umbilical fissure between it and the base of the shell. The siphonal canal is rather long, slightly reflexed upwards at base.

Distribution
This marine species occurs off Tanzania, Zanzibar, the Philippines, Singapore, Indonesia, Papua New Guinea, the Fiji Islands and off the Nansha Islands, China.

References

 Powell AWB. 1967. The family Turridae in the Indo-Pacific. Part 1a. The subfamily Turrinae concluded. Indo-Pacific Moll. 1(7):409–432.
 Liu, J.Y. [Ruiyu] (ed.). (2008). Checklist of marine biota of China seas. China Science Press. 1267 pp
 Li B.Q., Kilburn R.N., & Li X.Z. (2010). Report on Crassispirinae Morrison, (Mollusca: Neogastropoda: Turridae) from the China Seas. Journal of Natural History. 44, 699-740.

External links
  Baoquan Li 李宝泉 & R.N. Kilburn, Report on Crassispirinae Morrison, 1966 (Mollusca: Neogastropoda: Turridae) from the China Seas; Journal of Natural History 44(11):699–740 · March 2010; DOI: 10.1080/00222930903470086

prestoni
Gastropods described in 1967